Daniel Anthony Perez is a Republican member of the Florida Legislature representing the state's 116th House district, which includes part of Miami-Dade County.

Florida House of Representatives
Perez defeated Jose Mallea in a special Republican primary held on July 25, 2017, winning 54.8% of the vote. In the September 26, 2017 special general election, Perez won 65.8% of the vote, defeating Democrat Gabriela Mayaudon.

Seeking election to his first full term in 2018, Perez defeated Frank Polo in the August 28, 2018 Republican primary, winning 80.5% of the vote. In the November 6, 2018 general election, Perez won 57.32% of the vote, defeating Democrat James Harden.

In 2022, Perez defended Republican efforts to add elaborate requirements for voters to vote by mail. These included forcing voters to put their double-enveloped ballots inside a third envelope and to mark the last four letters of their identity numbers. Election officials characterized the requirements as a "recipe for disaster" while voting rights advocates characterized the efforts as voter suppression. Perez defended the measures, saying "the process is actually going to be simpler... and at the same time it would be safer."

References

Hispanic and Latino American state legislators in Florida
Republican Party members of the Florida House of Representatives
Living people
21st-century American politicians
Florida State University alumni
Loyola University New Orleans College of Law alumni
1987 births
Latino conservatism in the United States